Ercolano Ercolanetti (27 April 1615 – 1687) was an Italian painter of landscapes, active in his native Perugia.

He studied for a time in Rome with an unknown master; he returned to Perugia where he worked under Bernardino Gagliardi and Fabio della Cornia.

References

1615 births
1687 deaths
17th-century Italian painters
Italian male painters
Italian landscape painters
Umbrian painters